Pros & Cons (sometimes written as Pros and Cons) is a 1999 comedy film starring Larry Miller (who also wrote the screenplay), Tommy Davidson, and Delroy Lindo. The broadcast rights were purchased by Cinemax who aired the debut of the film in 1999 on their cable network. It was directed by Boris Damast. After its cable debut, it was released on video in 1999 by Warner Home Video under the New Line Home Video imprint.

This was the final film appearance of actor Darren McGavin.

Plot
Miller plays Ben Babbitt, an accountant who is imprisoned for financial crimes. Davidson plays his cellmate Ron Carter. Ben is endeared to Kyle, a powerful prisoner who convinces Ben to use his computer expertise to help them escape from prison.

Primary cast
Larry Miller .... Ben Babbitt
Tommy Davidson .... Ron Carter
Delroy Lindo .... Kyle Pettibone
Darren McGavin .... Mr. Stanford
David Rasche .... Jack Stanford
Christine Ebersole .... Kathy Stanford
Wayne Knight .... Wayne the Guard
Julie Warner .... Eileen
Terry Sweeney .... Decorator

References

External links
 
 

1999 films
1990s crime comedy films
1999 direct-to-video films
American crime comedy films
American direct-to-video films
American prison comedy films
Films scored by Michel Colombier
1990s prison films
1999 comedy films
1990s English-language films
1990s American films